Andrew "Sunbeam" Mitchell (1906-1989) was a Memphis-based businessman. He owned various establishments on the Chitlin' Circuit. Mitchell ran nightclubs for 40 years until selling off his holdings in the 1980s.

In the 1940s, post-war Memphis became a hot spot for blues music. African American musicians began moving to Memphis, and established entertainers would perform and record here. During segregation, there were few venues where African Americans could perform, and fewer hotels where they could stay. In 1944, Sunbeam Mitchell opened the Mitchell Hotel which lodged well-known musicians, and soon he began operating nightclubs.

Life and career 
Born in Memphis, Tennessee on November 6, 1906, Mitchell grew up on Beale Street. His father was a drayman. Mitchell worked in a factory in Detroit during World War II.

In 1944, Mitchell and his wife Ernestine Mitchell (nee McKinney) leased two floors above Abe Plough's Pantaze Drug Store on Beale Street in Memphis, Tennessee. He opened the Mitchell Hotel in 1944, and shortly thereafter created his first nightclub, the Domino Lounge.

In the book The Chitlin' Circuit, author Preston Lauterbach wrote, "Sunbeam laid the cornerstone of what came to be known as the Memphis sound." In addition to his nightclubs, hotel, and grill, Mitchell operated Mitchell Amusement Enterprises in the 1950s, booking dates for musicians Little Milton and Lowell Fulson. He later created a record label, Paradise Records. Mitchell also sponsored dances at venues such as Ellis Auditorium, where Ray Charles performed in 1961.

Mitchell continued running club and other establishments for forty tears. He died in August 1989..

Mitchell Hotel 
Musicians who performed at his nightclub weren't allowed to stay at the whites-only hotels, so the Mitchell Hotel opened in 1944 and was billed as "Memphis' Leading Color Hotel." His wife Ernestine, of Ernestine and Hazel's, managed the hotel which had thirty rooms, "gas head and modern baths." Mitchell Hotel attracted famous musicians on the Chitlin' Circuit such as Nat "King" Cole, Count Bassie, Muddy Waters, and B.B. King.

Mitchell and his wife Ernestine, earned a reputation among traveling musicians for their generosity. They often provided struggling musicians with food and shelter. In a 1981 interview with the Memphis Press-Scimitar, Mitchell stated, "All of them knew they could come to Memphis and be taken care of in those days." Little Richard stayed at the Mitchell Hotel for weeks when he didn't have any money. B.B. King said, "Anytime you didn't have any money, or anything, you could always go get a room and a bowl of chili."

Singer Johnny Ace was a frequent resident. When he died in 1954, the Mitchells were left with his clothes and belongings.

Club Handy 
In 1945, Mitchel opened the Domino Lounge at 195 Hernando Street. After a few years he changed the name to Club Handy. the venue was named for W.C. Handy, "the father of the blues." It was located on the second-floor lounge of his hotel. At Club Handy, Mitchell employed dancing girls called the Mitchellettes and a house band. The house band for Club Handy was led by Bill Harvey.

Little Junior Parker, Bobby Bland, and B.B. King performed regularly at Club Handy. Elvis Presley saw Lowell fulsom perform at Club Handy in 1954. Acts such as the Five Royales, Jimmy McCracklin, Arthur Prysock stopped in for one-nighters in the late 1950s. The Ike & Tina Turner Revue performed at Club Handy in the 1960s.

Photographer Ernest Withers took some of his iconic images of Memphis nightlife at Club Handy.

Club Ebony 
Club Handy was originally a roller skating rink called The Hippodrome. In 1955, Mitchell purchased the venue and renamed it Club Ebony, an R&B club located at 500 Beale Street. The club was later owned by Johnnie Currie and renamed The Hippodrome again.

Club Paradise 
Mitchell operated Club Paradise from 1962 until 1985, which was the largest nightclub in Memphis. The 3,200-seat capacity venue was located at 645 E. Georgia Avenue. Bobby "Blue" Bland performed on the opening night, March 21, 1965. In 1966, the Memphis City Commission attempted to purchase the club with federal funds and convert it into a recreation center. Mitchell entered lease-to-own agreement and eventually purchased the venue. In the 1960s and 1970s, soul and funk musicians Funkadelic, Sam & Dave, O.V. Wright, Ike & Tina Turner and the Delfonics performed at Club Paradise. Mitchell also rented the club out to fraternities.

In 2016, Club Paradise reopened as a community center, the Paradise Entertainment Center.

References

External links 

 The Historic Hippodrome

1906 births
1989 deaths
People from Memphis, Tennessee
Culture of Memphis, Tennessee
African-American businesspeople
African-American company founders
American company founders
20th-century African-American people